Jupiter Mountain is a high mountain summit in the Needle Mountains range of the Rocky Mountains of North America.

Mountain

Historical names
Jupiter Mountain – 1972 
Jupiter Peak

See also

List of Colorado mountain ranges
List of Colorado mountain summits
List of Colorado fourteeners
List of Colorado 4000 meter prominent summits
List of the most prominent summits of Colorado
List of Colorado county high points

References

External links

Mountains of Colorado
Mountains of La Plata County, Colorado
San Juan National Forest
San Juan Mountains (Colorado)
North American 4000 m summits